Output in economics is the "quantity (or quality) of goods or services produced in a given time period, by a firm, industry, or country", whether consumed or used for further production.
The concept of national output is essential in the field of macroeconomics. It is national output that makes a country rich, not large amounts of money.

Definition 

Output is the result of an economic process that has used inputs to produce a product or service that is available for sale or use somewhere else.

Net output, sometimes called netput is a quantity, in the context of production, that is positive if the quantity is output by the production process and negative if it is an input to the production process.

Microeconomics

Output condition 

The profit-maximizing output condition for producers equates the relative marginal cost of any two goods to the relative selling price of those goods; i.e.

One may also deduce the ratio of marginal costs as the slope of the production–possibility frontier, which would give the rate at which society can transform one good into another.

Macroeconomics

Relation to income

When a particular quantity of output is produced, an identical quantity of income is generated because the output belongs to someone. Thus we have the identity that output equals income (where an identity is an equation that is always true regardless of the values of any variables).

Output can be sub-divided into components based on whose demand has generated it – total consumption C by members of the public (including on imported goods) minus imported goods  (the difference being consumption of domestic output), spending  by the government, domestically produced goods  bought by foreigners, planned inventory accumulation , unplanned inventory accumulation  resulting from incorrect predictions of consumer and government demand, and fixed investment  on machinery and the like.

Likewise, income can be sub-divided according to the uses to which it is put – consumption spending, taxes  paid, and the portion of income neither taxed nor spent (saving ).

Since output identically equals income, the above leads to the following identity:

where the triple-bar sign denotes an identity. This identity is distinct from the goods market equilibrium condition, which is satisfied when unplanned inventory investment equals zero:

Output is the result of an economic process that has used inputs to produce a product or service that is available for sale or use somewhere else.

Net output, sometimes called netput, is a quantity, in the context of production, that is positive if the quantity is output by the production process and negative if it is an input to the production process.

Measuring national output

GDP (gross domestic product) is the most popular measure of national output.
The main challenge in using this method is how to avoid counting the same product more than once. Logically, the total output should be equal to the value of all goods and services produced in a country, but in counting every good and service, one actually ends up counting the same output again and again, at multiple stages of production.
One way of tackling the problem of over counting is to consider only value addition, i.e. the new output created at each stage of production.

To illustrate, we can take a dressmaker who purchased a dress material for 500 rupees, then stitched and put final touches on the dress. She then sold the dress for 800 rupees (her costs of finishing the dress were 150 rupees).
We can then say that she added 150 rupees worth of output to the dress, as opposed to saying that she produced 800 rupees worth of output. So value addition is equal to the sales price of a good or service, minus all the non-labour costs used to produce it.

To avoid the issue of over-counting, one can also focus entirely on final sales, where, though not directly but implicitly, all prior stage of output creation are accounted for.

Even though both methods are widely acknowledged to be accurate, the second method is known as the expenditure method and is used more widely, and is the standard method of calculation of GDP in most countries.
The logic behind using the expenditure method is that if all the expenditures on final goods are added up, the sum should equal the total production because every produced good is eventually produced in some form or the other.

In both these methods, one has to be wary of the fact that consumption includes all spending by households, but business investment does not include all spending by firms, because if it did this would result in massive double counting because many of the things firms buy are processed and resold to consumers. As a result, investment only includes expenditures on output that is not expected to be used up in the short run.

Another possible way in which one may over count is if imports are involved. If a foreign individual or firm bought a product from some other country, e.g., if an American firm bought a Cambodian manufactured good, then this expenditure cannot be counted in the consumer expenditures in American GDP since the output being purchased is foreign. To correct this issue, imports are eliminated from GDP.

Taking all this into account, we see that

A third way to calculate national output is to focus on income. In this method, we look at income which is paid to factors of production and labour for their services in producing the output. This is usually paid in the form of wages and salaries; it can also be paid in the form of royalties, rent, dividends, etc. Because income is a payment for output, it is assumed that total income should eventually be equal to total output.

Fluctuations in output
In macroeconomics, the question of why national output fluctuates is a very critical one. And though no consensus has developed, there are some factors which economists agree make output go up and down.
If we take growth into consideration, then most economists agree that there are three basic sources for economic growth: an increase in labour usage, an increase in capital usage and an increase in effectiveness of the factors of production.
Just as increases in usage or effectiveness of factors of production can cause output to go up, anything that causes labour, capital or their effectiveness to go down will cause a decline in output or at least a decline in its rate of growth.

International economics

Exchange of output among nations

Exchange of output between two countries is a very common occurrence, as there is always trade taking place between different nations of the world. For example, Japan may trade its electronics with Germany for German-made cars. If the value of the trades being made by both the countries is equal at that point of time, then their trade accounts would be balanced: the exports would be exactly equal to imports in both the countries.

See also

Notes

Macroeconomic aggregates